Juan Alonso de Guzmán y Suárez de Figueroa Orozco, 1st Duke of Medina Sidonia and 3rd Count de Niebla (in full) (c. 1405 – December 1468) was a Spanish nobleman and military figure of the Reconquista.

Juan Alonso de Guzmán was the son of Enrique de Guzmán, 2nd Count of Niebla and of Teresa Suárez de Figueroa y Orozco, Lady of Escamilla and Santa Olalla. He was awarded the title of Duke of Medina Sidonia by King John II of Castile on February 1445. He married Doña Maria de la Cerda y de Sarmiento, daughter of Luis de la Cerda y Mendoza, 3rd Count de Medinaceli. It seems there was no legal male issue. He had however more than one illegitimate child  with an Isabel de Menezes y Fonseca, apparently also marrying Doña Elvira de Guzmán, daughter of Don Alvaro de Guzmán, 6th Señor de Orgáz, who is reported as marrying his son, Martin to Violante Martinez de Aragón.

This was apparently not the first time however that the title of Duke of Medina Sidonia was awarded. King Henry II of Castile (c.1334-1379), had an illegitimate son named Enrique de Castilla y de Sousa with Juana de Sousa, but after being made a duke by his father, he died in 1404, without a successor. The title then returned to the Crown under King Henry III of Castile, until it was awarded again in 1445 by Henry III's son, King John II, to the Guzmán family. The addition of "El Bueno" to the family name of Guzmán was used much later than the ends of the 13th century by several members of the house, proud of their Nordic background by then, which included many statesmen, generals and colonial viceroys.

Sources

1405 births
1468 deaths
101
Juan Alonso
15th-century Castilians
Grandees of Spain